Judgment and Decision Making is a bimonthly peer-reviewed open access scientific journal covering the psychology of human judgment and decision making. An online-only journal, it was established in 2006 and is published by the Society for Judgment and Decision Making. It is the journal of both the Society for Judgment and Decision Making and the European Association for Decision Making. The editors-in-chief are Jonathan Baron (University of Pennsylvania) and Andreas Glöckner (University of Cologne). According to the Journal Citation Reports, the journal has a 2017 impact factor of 2.525.

Judgment and decision making definition 
Judgment is considered to be the ability to determine relationships and also be able to draw conclusions from events with strong evidence. Throughout life, humans need to be able to make a decision with sound judgment to provide for their family and or make the best decision possible that will most benefit them in the long run. Decision making is the process when someone will choose between multiple alternatives. As stated above, being able to make a decision a good one at that you need to have a solid judgment. These two things tie in together; often, bad judgment can lead to bad decisions. Being able to make these good judgments and decisions also will depend highly on attention influences one will encounter.

References

External links

Decision-making
Publications established in 2006
Open access journals
Online-only journals
Bimonthly journals
Academic journals published by international learned and professional societies
English-language journals
Psychology journals